Jillian Aversa (née Goldin) is an American vocalist and composer best known for her contributions to video game soundtracks, YouTube music videos, and as a soloist with the international concert tour Video Games Live. In addition to her performances of video game music, she is a composer of contemporary New Age/World music and has released several solo albums. Her music video performances have received news coverage in Polygon, Wired, Nerdist, and Game Informer.

Video game soundtracks 

Halo: Combat Evolved Anniversary (2011): vocalist
Halo 2 Anniversary (2014): vocalist
Halo: Spartan Assault (2013): vocalist
Halo: Spartan Strike (2015): vocalist
God of War: Ghost of Sparta (2010): vocalist
Soulcalibur V (2012): vocalist, composer
Civilization V: Gods and Kings (2012): vocalist
Civilization IV: Beyond the Sword (2007): vocalist
Killer Instinct (2013): vocalist
Katamari Damacy: Tap My Katamari (2016): vocalist
Crimson Dragon (2013): vocalist
Shadowgate (2014): vocalist
Where the Water Tastes Like Wine (2018): vocalist
Pump It Up Pro 2 (2010): vocalist

Discography 

 Atlantis Awakening – composer, vocalist, lyricist
 Through Sand and Snow – composer, vocalist, lyricist
 Origins – composer, vocalist, lyricist
 Calling All Dawns – with Christopher Tin – vocalist
 Video Games Live: Level 4 – Video Games Live – vocalist, arranger
 Video Games Live: Level 3 – Video Games Live – vocalist
 Identity Sequence – with zircon – composer, vocalist, lyricist
 Antigravity – with zircon – composer, vocalist, lyricist
 Touhou Zerokyo Kitan ~ Sophisticated Insanity – with Hiroki Kikuta – vocalist, lyricist
 Just Fun – with Alexander Brandon – vocalist
 Beyond Libra – with Wilbert Roget II – vocalist
 The Answer: Armored Core Tribute Album – with Mattias Häggström Gerdt – vocalist
 The Lullaby Album – with Jennifer Thomas, Carolyn Southworth – vocalist
 Awakening – with Marc Enfroy – vocalist
 Synergy – Various Artists – composer, vocalist, lyricist

Video Games Live concert tour 
Aversa joined the Video Games Live concert tour as a solo vocalist in 2013. She also appeared as a soloist and arranger on the tour's Level 3 and Level 4 studio albums.

Personal life 
Aversa is married to composer and software developer Andrew Aversa, also known as Zircon. They reside in Maryland, and had a daughter in 2018 and a son in 2021.

References

External links 
 

21st-century American composers
American women composers
Living people
Video game composers
21st-century American women musicians
21st-century women composers
Year of birth missing (living people)